Isaac Fanous (December 19, 1919 – January 15, 2007) was an Egyptian Copt artist and scholar, who specialized in Coptic art and founded its contemporary school.

Early life and teaching
Fanous was born in Al-Minya and moved to Cairo to gain his degree from The Faculty of Applied arts now part of Helwan University in Egypt in 1941 and got a diploma in teaching in 1943.
Fanous was one of the first students of the Institute of Coptic Studies founded in 1954 and he obtained his doctorate in 1958 . His two-year study grant in the Louvre in the mid- 1960s was a turning point in his career. He took the opportunity, while in France, to study icon painting under Léonid Ouspensky, under whose patronage he developed a passion both as artist and theologian. This would lead, eventually, to him developing a style that was to become the new face of Coptic iconography in the mid-20th century.

Fanous chaired the Coptic Art department at the Institute of Coptic Studies in Cairo, and he has trained a number of other Coptic artists from outside Egypt.

Political changes
As wealthy patrons of the arts disappeared from Egypt's hitherto cosmopolitan art world following the 1952 revolution, they were replaced by the state, and the career of Fanous took off from the struggles and experiences of his time. That is to say, he became more keenly aware of his Egyptian heritage. He was proud of everything that comes from Al-Minya since the time of Akhnaten, who built his city in this area.

Modern Coptic iconography
For centuries before painters like Isaac Fanous the Coptic Orthodox church had its own style which is recognised as The Coptic style. Under the influence of the European art spread to Egypt in the nineteenth Century there are a lot of the Churches in Egypt which have Icons that are similar to a lot of the European (Western) Christianity Iconography style.

Fanous's contemporary school of icon painting came about as part of a general renaissance of Coptic culture which began during the patriarchate of Pope Cyril VI (1959–1971).

He capitalised on the already established Coptic style which could be seen in historic Coptic Churches, but in his own style which he developed over the years. 

The style of his painting is called Modern Coptic style and as he was a pioneer in this field Fanous is considered the father of modern Coptic icon painting and the initiator of the modern renaissance in Coptic art.

Fanous drew all the pictures and icons in St. Takla Haymanot's Church in Alexandria, which was consecrated in 1969. Between 1977 and 1978, he spent six months in the UK to paint icons in St Mark's Coptic Orthodox church in Allen Street, Kensington, London.

See also
Coptic art
Coptic Orthodox Church of Alexandria
Icon
List of prominent Copts

References

External links
Obituary for Isaac Fanous in Al Ahram daily newspaper in Arabic
 Mosaic Frescos of St. Takla Haymanot's Story, Alexandria, Egypt
 St Mark's Coptic Orthodox church website , which includes a gallery of the Icons of the church 
 Coptic Icons.
 The Coptic Icons from Holy Virgin Mary Church in Los Angeles
http://www.copts-united.com/wrr/go1.php?subaction=showfull&id=1169064300&archive=&start_from=&ucat=79&
http://ccdl.libraries.claremont.edu/cdm/singleitem/collection/cce/id/2162/rec/1

Egyptian people of Coptic descent
Coptic Christians from Egypt
Art historians
Coptic art
1919 births
2007 deaths
Academics from Cairo
Artists from Cairo
Helwan University alumni
Icon painters
20th-century Egyptian painters